Sjöstedt or Sjoestedt is a surname of Swedish origin. Notable people with the surname include:

Bengt Sjöstedt (1906–1981), Finnish hurdler
Bror Yngve Sjöstedt (1866–1948), Swedish naturalist
Jonas Sjöstedt (born 1964), Swedish politician
Marie-Louise Sjoestedt-Jonval (1900–1940), French linguist and literary scholar
Rasmus Sjöstedt (born 1992), Swedish footballer
Sture Sjöstedt (1916–2008), Swedish actor and film producer
Thure Sjöstedt (1903–1956), Swedish wrestler
Anshelm Sjöstedt-Jussila (1869–1926), Finnish politician

Swedish-language surnames